The Book of Mormon Movie, Volume 1: The Journey is a 2003 American adventure drama film directed by Gary Rogers and written by Rogers and Craig Clyde. A film adaptation of the first two books in the Book of Mormon, a religious text of scripture, the film was given a limited theatrical release on September 12, 2003.

Plot
The film is based on the first two books of the Book of Mormon: First Nephi and Second Nephi. The source material contains much theological discussion, and parables, some of which have been cut from the adaptation due to their unsuitability as narrative material. Some of the visionary material is retained.

The film starts in Jerusalem around 600 BC, where the audience meets patriarch Lehi, his wife Sariah, and their four sons: Laman, Lemuel, Sam, and Nephi. Lehi and his wife are devout believers in God, as are their sons, Nephi and Sam. Laman and Lemuel are more wayward and do not tend to agree with the commands of God or their father and brother Nephi.

While in Jerusalem, Lehi prophesies that the city will be destroyed. This elicits a negative reaction from many people, to the point of their wanting to kill him. The family flees into the desert at this point and becomes nomadic.

While in the wilderness, Lehi sends Nephi and his brothers back to Jerusalem to try to get hold of the Brass Plates, as commanded by God. The Brass Plates are inscribed with ancient scriptures and records that they need to take with them on their journey and which will form part of the basis of the Book of Mormon.

However, these plates are within the compound of a powerful and violent man called Laban, who has many men under his command. They first try to persuade Laban to hand over the plates, but eventually a fight ensues and they are forced to flee. One of Laban's servants, Ishmael, ends up defecting to Lehi's side and joins his family in the desert.

Ishmael and Lehi's families intermarry, but Ishmael dies in the Arabian wilderness. The group is ordered to build a boat to take them to the new Promised Land, which they do with limited resources. Laman and Lemuel once more start complaining about this idea, but they all end up boarding this ship and leaving the Old World for the New.

They arrive in the New World after this voyage, but the quarrel within the family continues. After Lehi dies in the promised land, Laman and Lemuel, and their families, rebel again, and turn to evil things. The Lamanites separate from the Nephites. Because of this, Nephi and his allies have to escape them, and once more go into the wilderness.

Cast

 Noah Danby as Nephi
 Bryce Chamberlain as Lehi
 Jan Broberg Felt as Sariah
 Cragun Foulger as Lemuel
 Mark Gollaher as Laman
 Kirby Heyborne as Sam
 Sue Rowe as daughter of Lehi
 Bruce Newbold as Moroni
 Bern Kubiak as Jesus Christ
 Jacque Gray as Nephi's wife
 Ron Frederickson as Ishmael
 Todd Davis as Zoram
 Michael Flynn as Laban
 Richard J. Clifford as Lucan
 Brad Johnson as Jonathan

Production

Development
Rogers's inspiration was the Cecil B. DeMille 1956 version of The Ten Commandments. He envisioned The Book of Mormon as one long historical epic. His plan was to make nine films that cover the entire story of the book.

The film's length is two hours, and it was revealed on the DVD commentary that the first cut of the film was two hours and forty minutes.

Casting
Noah Danby was cast as Nephi because of his strong resemblance to the art of Arnold Friberg, who created a series of paintings inspired by The Book of Mormon.  He had never read the Book of Mormon prior to his casting. Danby is a devout Lutheran, and while at first he didn't feel comfortable in making the film due to religious differences, he has said in an interview for The Hollywood Reporter that he took the role to gain experience as an actor.

Filming
The desert scenes were filmed in Utah in the spring, and it was very cold. The "great and spacious building" was a five-foot miniature. The boat does not appear in the theatrical version of the scene in which the family arrives in the promised land. It was digitally added to that scene for the DVD version.

Mike Ripplinger directed and filmed the behind-the-scenes portion on the DVD release.

The film was mentioned in Paul C. Gutjahrs 2012 book The Book of Mormon: A Biography.

Release
The film was rated PG-13 for "a scene of violence", having contained an image of Nephi with blood splatter on his face after beheading Laban. This image was removed for home media releases, and the film received a PG rating on DVD.

Box office
Produced for $1.5 million, Book of Mormon opened in 29 theaters on September 12, 2003 and made $114,573 in its first weekend, ranking number 41 in the domestic box office. The film played for 35 weeks before closing on May 13, 2004, its widest release being 38 theaters, and it had grossed $1,680,020.

It is the fourth highest-grossing film in the history of LDS cinema.

Critical reception
The film was widely panned by Latter-day Saint and non-Latter-day Saint critics. Variety described it as "[w]ell meaning but often as tediously earnest as a Sunday sermon" In the Mormon Blogosphere, A Motley Vision gave it a grade of C−. In a 2010 literary study of the Book of Mormon, scholar Grant Hardy mentioned the film as "a not entirely successful attempt to bring the Book of Mormon to the big screen.":20

Review aggregator website Rotten Tomatoes scored 17% of 6 critics giving the film a positive review.

Soundtrack

 "Prologue/Joseph Meets Moroni" (01:48)
 "Main Theme" (02:31)
 "Playing Ball" (00:19)
 "I Nephi" (01:48)
 "Lucan Gets Laban" (01:39)
 "We Shall Never See This House Again" (01:32)
 "Leaving Jerusalem" (01:34)
 "In the Presence of Deity" (02:26)
 "Brothers Return From Brass Plates" (01:38)
 "Laman's Chase" (00:48)
 "Nephi Sneaking Into Jerusalem" (02:15)
 "Beheading of Laban" (02:28)
 "Returned to the Tent of My Father" (00:38)
 "Return for Ishmael's Family" (01:15)
 "Love Theme" (03:37)
 "Nephi's Vision" (03:26)
 "Wedding & Celebration" (02:55)
 "Wandering in the Desert" (02:36)
 "Ishmael's Death/Bountiful" (03:03)
 "Enticing" (01:35)
 "Storm at Sea" (03:00)
 "The Promised Land" (03:42)
 "Lehi's Death" (03:33)
 "Attack at Night" (00:48)
 "I Miss My Brothers" (02:25)
 "Sam's Journey" (00:53)
 "Lamanites" (02:29)
 "End Theme" (05:37)
 "Forever Will Be" (03:50)

Notes

References

External links
 
 
 

2000s adventure drama films
2003 independent films
American adventure drama films
American independent films
Films about religion
Films set in Jerusalem
Films set in the 6th century BC
Films shot in Utah
Mormon cinema
Films based on the Book of Mormon
2003 drama films
Halestorm Entertainment films
2000s English-language films
2000s American films